Royal Galipeau (January 5, 1947 – January 27, 2018) was a Canadian politician who was Member of Parliament for the Ottawa—Orléans federal constituency. He was first elected as a Conservative Party candidate in the 2006 election, and was reelected in 2008 and 2011. He was one of the Deputy Speakers of the House of Commons between the 2006 and 2008 elections. He was defeated in the 2015 election by retired Canadian Forces Lieutenant-General Andrew Leslie. In February 2014, he revealed that he was battling multiple myeloma, but insisted he would run for office again in the 2015 election. Galipeau died from the disease in 2018.

Municipal politics and early career
In 1982, he was elected to Gloucester City Council. On city council, he helped introduce equal opportunity hiring policies and unsuccessfully pushed to replace the term "alderman" with a gender-neutral term. In 1985, he ran for mayor of Gloucester, finishing third behind fellow councillor Harry Allen and interim mayor Mitch Owens.

Galipeau was appointed in 2001 by the Council of the newly amalgamated city of Ottawa as Trustee of the Ottawa Public Library, where he helped introduce content-filtered Internet access to city public libraries to protect from Internet pornography on library computers. In 2004, he was the only Trustee of the previous term to be reappointed by City Council. He was twice elected as vice-chair of the Board.

Furthermore, he served on the Ottawa-Carleton Regional District Health Council, helping prepare a policy for the delivery of minority language health services. In 2005, Galipeau was involved in the East-West Light Rail Transit Corridor Environmental Assessment Committee, studying implementation of a rapid transit system across Ottawa. Galipeau has also served two terms as a director of TVOntario. In this role, he helped bring about the launch of the Francophone TFO service.

Federal politics
Galipeau started politics as a Liberal and worked for MPs Mauril Bélanger and Eugène Bellemare. He also served as campaign manager for the unsuccessful Liberal candidate in Carleton in the 1995 Ontario provincial election.

However, in May 2005, he decided to run for the Conservatives. The riding of Ottawa—Orléans was a Conservative target. In the 2004 federal election, Walter Robinson, the high-profile head of the Canadian Taxpayers Federation, failed to capture the seat, losing to Liberal newcomer Marc Godbout by 2,800 votes. Galipeau won the 2006 election by less than 2000 votes.

From April 2006 to November 2008, Galipeau was Deputy Chair of Committees of the Whole, which allowed him to sit in the Speaker's chair when the Speaker and Deputy Speaker were both absent. In May 2007, Galipeau apologized for an incident in which he broke parliamentary rules by crossing the floor to argue with Liberal MP David McGuinty after a heated exchange over the Conservative MP's record on Francophone rights.

After being re-elected in the 2008 election, Galipeau ran to replace Peter Milliken as Speaker of the House, but lost. Galipeau was re-elected in the 2011 election, but was defeated by a nearly 2-to-1 margin in the 2015 federal election to former Lieutenant-General Andrew Leslie of the Liberal Party.

Galipeau was an anti-abortion MP and attended and spoke at the Campaign Life Coalition's annual March for Life event on Parliament Hill several times, including in 2011, 2013, and 2015.

Diagnosed with multiple myeloma, a form of cancer, in 2015, he died of the disease on January 27, 2018.

Electoral history

References

External links
 

1947 births
2018 deaths
Activists from Ontario
Businesspeople from Ottawa
Canadian anti-abortion activists
Conservative Party of Canada MPs
Deaths from multiple myeloma
Franco-Ontarian people
Members of the House of Commons of Canada from Ontario
Ontario municipal councillors
Politicians from Ottawa
People from the United Counties of Prescott and Russell
21st-century Canadian politicians
Deaths from cancer in Ontario